"Snow Tha Product: Bzrp Music Sessions, Vol. 39" is a song by Argentine record producer Bizarrap and American rapper Snow Tha Product. It was released on April 28, 2021, through Warner Music Latina and Dale Play Records. The music video for the song has more than 212 million views on YouTube. The song reached the top 20 of the Billboard Argentina Hot 100 chart. The song was nominated for the 22nd Annual Latin Grammy Awards for "Best Rap/Hip-Hop Song".

Background
The song was announced by producer Bizarrap through a preview shown on his Instagram. The lyrics of the song combine the English and Spanish language, something that is traditional in the Snow Tha Product songs.

Personnel
Credits adapted from Genius.

 Snow Tha Product – vocals
 Bizarrap – producer, recording engineer
 Evlay – mixing
 Javier Fracchia – mastering
 GFX Yisus – artwork
 Salvi Díaz – videographer
 Agustín Sartori – video vfx

Charts

Certifications

References

2021 singles
2021 songs
Bizarrap songs
Spanglish songs
Song recordings produced by Bizarrap
Warner Music Latina singles